Events from 1640 in Catalonia.

Incumbents
 Count of Barcelona – Philip III
 President of the Generalitat of Catalonia – Pau Claris

Events
 28 January – The Spanish armies recovered the castle of Salses from French occupation.
 February–May – The Spanish soldiers remained in Catalonia, and the tensions between troops and Catalan peasants, who were forced to quarter them, increased.
 3 May – Riudarenes, a village near to Girona, was burn by Spanish soldiers.
 14 May – Santa Coloma de Farners was burnt by Spanish soldiers.
 22 May – Rebels liberated the deputy of the Generalitat Francesc de Tamarit from prison.
 7 June – Corpus de Sang. The reapers stationed in Barcelona and Sant Andreu del Palomar started a riot in which the Viceroy of Catalonia, Dalmau de Queralt, Count of Santa Coloma was killed.
 7 September – Pact of Ceret between the Generalitat and the Kingdom of France, establishing a Franco-Catalan alliance.
 10 September – Pau Claris, President of the Generalitat, called the politician members of the Principality in order to form a Junta de Braços or Braços Generals (States-General), a consultive body.

References

History of Catalonia
1640